Negatives is a 2004 album by Phantom Planet. Originally a fanclub-only CD, in 2006 Phantom Planet announced in its official blog that the album would be released for download on iTunes.com. The songs on Negatives were songs written for The Guest but didn't make the final release. It was released as the first part of the Negatives. It contains new single "The Galleria"

Track listing

References

2004 compilation albums
Phantom Planet albums